Said Achtar (born 28 May 1957) is a Syrian judoka. He competed in the 1980 Summer Olympics.

References

1957 births
Living people
Judoka at the 1980 Summer Olympics
Syrian male judoka
Olympic judoka of Syria